The Carlos Palanca Memorial Awards for Literature winners in the year 1980 (rank, title of winning entry, name of author).

English division
Novel
Special prize: "Silapulapu and The Zebut Brothers" by Remmie Suaco Brillo

Short story
First prize: "The Fruit of the Vine" by Rowena Tiempo Torrevillas
Second prize: "Flashback" by Rosario Garcellano
Third prize: "The Outsider" by Cristina Pantoja-Hidalgo

Poetry
First prize: "Voices Prompted by the News, A Staple Food" by Alfredo N. Salanga
Second prize: "Counterclockwise" by Gemino Abad Jr.; and "R+A+D+I+O" by Ricardo De Ungria
Third prize: "The Running Shadow and the Street Tree" by Rowena Tiempo Torrevillas; and "Travelogue" by Alfred A. Yuson

Essay
First prize: "Deja Vu In America or One of the Songs" by Marra Pl. Lanot
Second prize: "Liberal Individualism and the Commonwealth Novels" by Patricia Melendrez-Cruz
Third prize: "Turning Back and Moving Back" by Ligaya Tiamson-Rubin

One-Act Play
First prize: "Anatomy of a Passionate Derangement" by Eric Gamalinda
Second prize: "Captive Word" by Elsa M. Coscolluela
Third prize: "The Surrender" by Alfredo N. Salanga

Full-length play
First prize: No winner
Second prize: "In My Father's House" by Elsa M. Coscolluela
Third prize: "Fiesta" by Herminia Sison
Honorable mention "Looking for Edison or What's the Name of the Guy Who Invented Something" by Lemuel Torrevillas

Filipino division
Novel
Grand prize: "Gapo" by Lualhati Bautista

Short story
First prize: "Kandong" by Reynaldo A. Duque
Second prize: "Ang Tornilyo sa Utak ni Rufo Sabater" by Alfonso Mendoza
Third prize: "Orasyon sa Simbahan, sa Piitan at sa Coral Ballroom ng Manila Hilton" by Benigno R. Juan

Poetry
First prize: "Pula ang Putik sa Konkretong Looban at iba pang Tula" by Teresita Capili-Sayo
Second prize: "Sa Kopitang Litro, Ang Alak ay Krudo at iba pang tula" by Orlando Olgado
Third prize: "Mga Talababa ng Panahon" by Mar Al. Tiburcio

Essay
First prize: "Ang Krus sa Balikat ng Makata" by Pedro L. Ricarte
Second prize: "Ilang Talang Luma Buhat sa Talaarawan ng Isang May Nunal sa Talampakan" by Jun Cruz Reyes
Third prize: "Pagkamulat at Iba Pang Sanaysay" by Benigno R. Juan

One-act play
First prize: "Isang Gabi sa Beerhouse" by Wilfred S. Victoria; and "Kumbersasyon" by Rene O. Villanueva
Second prize: "Kuwadro" by Isagani R. Cruz; and "Pari-pari" by Angelito Tiongson
Third prize: "At Iba Pang Lakay..." by Dong Delos Reyes; and "Awiyao" by Ruth Elynia S. Mabanglo

Full-length play
First prize: "Daungan... Laot... Daungan" by Dong Delos Reyes
Second prize: "Ambon sa Madaling Araw" by Jose Y. Dalisay Jr.
Third prize: "1898: Sa Mata ng Daluyong" by Conrado De Quiros

References
 

Palanca Awards
Palanca Awards, 1980